Hilda Jerea (17 March 1916 – 14 May 1980) was a Romanian-Jewish pianist, conductor, and composer. Born in Iaşi, she began her education at the Conservatory of Music in Iaşi and finished it in Bucharest where her teachers were Mihail Jora, Florica Musicescu and Dimitrie Cuclin. After graduation she pursued further studies in Paris and Budapest. She played the piano in concertos or chamber ensembles from 1936. Her best-known composition is the oratorio Under the Wake-Up Sun from 1951. She was distinguished with the State Prize of Romania and the Order of Labour.  

In 1962, she founded and conducted the Musica Nova Chamber Orchestra. She died in Bucharest.

References 

Romanian composers
Musicians from Iași
1916 births
1980 deaths
20th-century composers

Romanian women pianists
Romanian women musicians
Romanian Jews